Crazy TV is a Mauritian entertainment and comedy show created by Nadeem Varsally. The first season of the show premiered on MBC 2 on 16 October 2012. The season 2, which debuted on 27 October 2014, aired on the same channel from Monday to Friday at 18H50 MUT. Season 4,5 and 6 of the show were available on Facebook and YouTube.

Premise 
Crazy TV gathers several genres, sketches, parodies, gags and promotes artists. It is interactive.

References 

Mauritian television series
Mauritius Broadcasting Corporation original programming/
2010s Mauritian television series
2012 Mauritian television series debuts